The Halfpint Range is a low arcuate mountain range in eastern Nye County and extending into southwest Lincoln County, Nevada. The western portion of the range lies within the Nevada Test Site. Yucca Flat and Plutonium Valley lie to west and Frenchman Flat to the south. The Buried Hills, the Papoose Range and Papoose Lake lie to the east. French Peak is at the south end and Banded Mountain lies at the north end of the range.

References 

Mountain ranges of Nevada
Mountain ranges of Nye County, Nevada